The 2008 Copa Perú season, the promotion tournament of Peruvian football, started on February 1.

The tournament has 5 stages. The first four stages are played as mini-league round-robin tournaments, except for third stage in region IV, which is played as a knockout stage. The final stage features two knockout rounds and a final four-team group stage to determine the two promoted teams.

The 2008 Peru Cup started with the District Stage on February 1. The next stage was the Provincial Stage which started, on June 1. The tournament continued with the Departamental Stage on July 16. The Regional Staged followed. The National Stage started on November 8. The winner and runner-up of the National Stage will be promoted to the First Division.

Departmental Stage
The following list shows the teams that qualified for the Regional Stage.

Regional Stage
Each region had two teams qualify for the next stage. The playoffs only determined the respective regional winners.

Region I
Region I includes qualified teams from Amazonas, Lambayeque, Tumbes and Piura region.

Group A

Group B

Playoff

Region II
Region II includes qualified teams from Ancash, Cajamarca, La Libertad and San Martín region.

Group A

Group B

Region III
Region III includes qualified teams from Loreto and Ucayali region.

Region IV
Region IV includes qualified teams from Lima and Callao region. This region played as a knockout cup system and the finalists qualified.

First Stage

Semifinals

Regional Final 

*The 2nd leg between Unión Huaral and Íntimo Cable Visión was suspended by the FPF because of some incidents with the crowd in the first game. Cable Visión qualified for the next round

Region V
Region V includes qualified teams from Junín, Pasco and Huánuco region.

Group A

Group B

Region VI
Region VI includes qualified teams from Ayacucho, Huancavelica and Ica region. Two teams qualified from this stage.

Group A

Group B

Region VII
Region VII includes qualified teams from Arequipa, Moquegua and Tacna region.

Group A

Group B

Playoffs

Region VIII
Region VIII includes qualified teams from Apurimac, Cusco, Madre de Dios and Puno region.

Group A

Group B

Playoffs

National Stage
The National Stage started on November 8. This stage had two knockout rounds and four-team group stage. The winners and runners-up of the National Stage will be promoted to the First Division. The two semifinalists as well as the best quarterfinalist will be promoted to the Second Division.

Final group stage

Round 1

Round 2

Round 3

Notes

External links
  FutbolPeruano.com
  Semanario Pasión

Copa Perú seasons
2008 domestic association football cups
Cop